Team of the Decade may refer to:

 Wallaby Team of the Decade, from Australian Rugby for rugby union
 Adelaide Crows Team of the Decade, for the Australian Rules Football team
 ESPN World Team of the Decade

See also

 Team of the century
 Team of the Year (disambiguation)